Keammar Rudolph Daley (born 18 February 1988) is a Jamaican footballer who is currently plays for Waterhouse F.C.

Career

Club

Meadhaven United 
Daley had played with Meadhaven United as a midfielder since 2004 under the guidance of the late coach, David Hunt. Daley bagged 12 goals in the 2008/2009 Digicel Premier League (DPL) season, which led to him winning the Junior Player of the Season award in the DPL. Daley also won the Player of the Season award the same year in the National Under-21 League. For the 2009/2010 DPL season, Daley initially signed with previous champions, Tivoli Gardens FC, on a season-long loan. However, the transfer was later made permanent.

Tivoli Gardens FC 
Daley had a strong 2009/2010 DPL season, leading his team to the end of the first-round final. He has scored 10 goals for Tivoli Gardens as of April 2010. In 2010/2011, Daley led Tivoli Gardens to their fifth Premiere League title.

Preston North End
After having a successful trial period over the summer, Daley signed a two-year deal for English League 1 club Preston North End on transfer deadline day Wednesday 31 August 2011. He made his debut in the 2–1 defeat against Southampton in the League Cup, but was substituted at half time.

Daley's contract was mutually terminated on 13 January 2013.

Tivoli Gardens FC 

Following his release from Preston North End in early 2013, Daley, in April 2013, returned to Tivoli Gardens.

Harbour View FC 

Daley had a brief stint at Harbour View F.C. from August 2015 – January 2016.

UWI FC 

In January 2016, Daley moved to UWI F.C.

Waterhouse F.C. 

For the 2018-2019 RSPL, Daley moved to Waterhouse F.C.

International 
Youth

Keammar Daley was a member of the 2007 U-20 National team at the CONCACAF finals, and also had an outstanding tournament at the 2007 Pan American Games in Rio de Janeiro. His four-goal tally resulted in a silver medal for Jamaica. Daley also appeared for Jamaica's U-23 team in 2007 during an Olympic qualifying match in Haiti.

Senior

Daley is a member of the Jamaica national football team, who made his senior national team debut in July 2008 versus El Salvador. He scored his first senior national team goal for the "Reggae Boyz" in June 2009, in a friendly game against Panama. Daley most recent played for Jamaica in a 2–1 loss to Argentina. He also featured prominently in 2011 for the Reggaeboyz, leading the team to the quarterfinals of the 2011 CONCACAF Gold Cup.

References

External links

1988 births
Living people
Jamaica international footballers
Jamaican footballers
Jamaican expatriate footballers
Tivoli Gardens F.C. players
Preston North End F.C. players
Footballers at the 2007 Pan American Games
2011 CONCACAF Gold Cup players
English Football League players
Expatriate footballers in England
Meadhaven United F.C. players
UWI F.C. players
Pan American Games silver medalists for Jamaica
Pan American Games medalists in football
Association football forwards
National Premier League players
Medalists at the 2007 Pan American Games
Jamaica under-20 international footballers